The 1998 Colorado State Rams football team represented Colorado State University in the 1998 NCAA Division I-A football season. The team was led by sixth-year head coach Sonny Lubick and played its home games at Hughes Stadium. They finished the regular season with an 8–4 record overall and a 5–3 record in the Western Athletic Conference to finish 3rd in the Mountain Division. This was their last season in the WAC before they joined the Mountain West Conference.

Schedule

Rankings

References

Colorado State
Colorado State Rams football seasons
Colorado State Rams football